Rockwell is an 'L' station on the CTA's Brown Line. It is an at-grade station with a single island platform, located in Chicago's Lincoln Square neighborhood. Rockwell is the last station on the surface section of the Brown Line; between Rockwell and Western the line ascends and runs on elevated tracks for the rest of the route.

Location
Rockwell is a surface level station with a single entrance/exit situated at 4648 North Rockwell Street between Leland Avenue and Eastwood Avenue in the Lincoln Square neighborhood of Chicago. The area surrounding the station consists of mostly residential single family homes or two-flats, with a small neighborhood shopping district flanking the station entrance on Rockwell Street.

History
Rockwell opened December 14, 1907 as part of Northwestern Elevated Railroad's Ravenswood branch. The design of the original station house and platform canopy were similar to those that still exist at the neighboring Francisco Station. As part of the CTA's Brown Line Capacity Expansion Project, the station closed on February 20, 2006, demolished and rebuilt. The new, ADA compliant, Rockwell station opened on August 16, 2006.

Notes and references

Notes

References

External links 

 Train schedule (PDF) at CTA official site
 Rockwell Street entrance from Google Maps Street View
 Rockwell station page at Chicago-L.org

CTA Brown Line stations
Railway stations in the United States opened in 1907
1907 establishments in Illinois